Gennaro Negri (fl. 1810s) was an early 19th-century Italian song composer.  His La Rosella with guitar accompaniment was recorded by Antonio Florio.

References

19th-century Italian composers
Italian male composers
19th-century Italian male musicians